One Woman to Another is a lost 1927 American silent comedy film directed by Frank Tuttle and written by J.L. Campbell and George Marion Jr. based upon a play by Frances Nordstrom. The film stars Florence Vidor, Theodore von Eltz, Marie Shotwell, Hedda Hopper, Roy Stewart and Joyce Coad. The film was released on September 17, 1927, by Paramount Pictures.

Cast  
Florence Vidor as Rita Farrell
Theodore von Eltz as John Bruce
Marie Shotwell as Mrs. Gray
Hedda Hopper as Olive Gresham
Roy Stewart as Rev. Robert Farrell
Joyce Coad as The Niece
Jimmy Boudwin as The Nephew

References

External links

1927 films
1920s English-language films
Silent American comedy films
1927 comedy films
Paramount Pictures films
Films directed by Frank Tuttle
American black-and-white films
Lost American films
American silent feature films
Lost comedy films
1927 lost films
1920s American films